Elections to Antrim Borough Council were held on 18 May 1977 on the same day as the other Northern Irish local government elections. The election used three district electoral areas to elect a total of 15 councillors.

Election results

Note: "Votes" are the first preference votes.

Districts summary

|- class="unsortable" align="centre"
!rowspan=2 align="left"|Ward
! % 
!Cllrs
! % 
!Cllrs
! %
!Cllrs
! %
!Cllrs
!rowspan=2|TotalCllrs
|- class="unsortable" align="center"
!colspan=2 bgcolor="" | UUP
!colspan=2 bgcolor="" | DUP
!colspan=2 bgcolor="" | Alliance
!colspan=2 bgcolor="white"| Others
|-
|align="left"|Area A
|30.1
|2
|20.2
|1
|5.3
|0
|bgcolor="DDDDDD"|44.2
|bgcolor="DDDDDD"|2
|5
|-
|align="left"|Area B
|bgcolor="40BFF5"|60.8
|bgcolor="40BFF5"|3
|17.0
|1
|22.2
|1
|0.0
|0
|5
|-
|align="left"|Area C
|bgcolor="40BFF5"|32.9
|bgcolor="40BFF5"|3
|17.6
|1
|24.1
|1
|25.4
|0
|5
|-
|- class="unsortable" class="sortbottom" style="background:#C9C9C9"
|align="left"| Total
|38.6
|8
|18.4
|3
|16.9
|2
|26.1
|2
|15
|-
|}

Districts results

Area A

1973: 2 x UUP, 1 x DUP, 1 x Independent, 1 x Independent Nationalist
1977: 2 x UUP, 1 x DUP, 1 x Independent, 1 x Independent Nationalist
1973-1977 Change: No change

Area B

1973: 4 x UUP, 1 x Alliance
1977: 3 x UUP, 1 x DUP, 1 x Alliance
1973-1977 Change: DUP gain from UUP

Area C

1973: 3 x UUP, 1 x Alliance, 1 x Vanguard
1977: 2 x UUP, 2 x Alliance, 1 x DUP
1973-1977 Change: DUP gain from Vanguard

References

Antrim Borough Council elections
Antrim